Elachyophtalma tricolor is a moth in the family Bombycidae. It was described by Cajetan Felder in 1861. It is found on the Moluccas.

References

Bombycidae
Moths described in 1861